Ghatsa silasi is a species of ray-finned fish in the genus Ghatsa. It can be found in the Kattamadithode stream, connected with Periyar River in Periyar Tiger Reserve at Chokkanpetty in Kerala, India.

References

Balitoridae
Fish described in 2011